Alan Pereira Costa, or simply Alan Bahia, (born January 14, 1983) is a Brazilian footballer. He currently plays for Rio Negro.

He made his professional debut in a 0-0 draw away to Goiás on October 5, 2002. 
Bahia is also the player with most appearances for Atlético Paranaense in the history of the  Brazilian League, with 188 matches.

Honours
Atlético Paranaense
Paraná State League: 2005

Contract
1 January 2006 to 31 December 2009

References

External links

 sambafoot.com
 rubronegro.net
 CBF
 furacao.com
 atleticopr.com
 zerozero.pt

1983 births
Living people
Brazilian footballers
Brazilian expatriate footballers
Campeonato Brasileiro Série A players
Campeonato Brasileiro Série B players
Campeonato Brasileiro Série C players
J1 League players
Qatar Stars League players
Expatriate footballers in Japan
Expatriate footballers in Qatar
Club Athletico Paranaense players
Vissel Kobe players
Al-Khor SC players
Goiás Esporte Clube players
América Futebol Clube (RN) players
Esporte Clube Rio Verde players
Esporte Clube XV de Novembro (Piracicaba)
Treze Futebol Clube players
Paulista Futebol Clube players
Atlético Rio Negro Clube players
Association football midfielders